8-oxo-dGTP diphosphatase (MutT, 7,8-dihydro-8-oxoguanine triphosphatase, 8-oxo-dGTPase, 7,8-dihydro-8-oxo-dGTP pyrophosphohydrolase) is an enzyme with systematic name 8-oxo-dGTP diphosphohydrolase. This enzyme catalyses the following chemical reaction:

 8-oxo-dGTP + H2O  8-oxo-dGMP + diphosphate

This enzyme requires Mg2+.

References

External links 
 

EC 3.6.1